Omar Raúl Labruna (born 3 April 1957) is a former Argentine footballer and current coach of Primera División club Nueva Chicago.

Biography
"Omarcito" Labruna started his playing career at River Plate in 1976 during his father Ángel's time as manager of the club. He left River in 1981 and had spells with Quilmes, Platense and Deportivo Italiano.

Labruna spent several years working in coaching and as an assistant manager before becoming the manager of Belgrano de Córdoba in 2003. He then joined Huracán de Tres Arroyos and led the small provincial team to 2nd place in the Primera B Nacional in the Cluasura 2004 championship

In 2005, he became the manager of Olimpo de Bahía Blanca in the Primera División Argentina and in 2006 he was appointed as the manager of Colombian side Deportivo Cali. In 2008, he took over as manager of Gimnasia y Esgrima de Jujuy and was fired on 11 March 2009.

In March 2009, Labruna returned to Belgrano de Córdoba of the 2nd division.

References

External links
Omar Labruna – Managerial statistics in the Argentine Primera at Fútbol XXI  
Interview with Olé 

1957 births
Living people
Footballers from Buenos Aires
Argentine footballers
Club Atlético River Plate footballers
Quilmes Atlético Club footballers
Club Atlético Platense footballers
Argentine Primera División players
Aldosivi managers
Argentine football managers
Club Atlético Belgrano managers
Olimpo managers
Club Atlético Huracán managers
Deportivo Cali managers
Audax Italiano managers
Gimnasia y Esgrima de Jujuy managers
Colo-Colo managers
Atlético de Rafaela managers
Expatriate football managers in Chile
Expatriate football managers in Colombia
Association football defenders
Everton de Viña del Mar managers